Lee Harrison (born 10 December 1977, Gravesend) is an English-born Scottish former rugby union player. A prop forward, Harrison has represented Scotland at Under-21 level and for the Scottish Students.

He started his rugby career as a Number 8 at Vigo Rugby Club as a youngster and represented Kent and London & South east.

He has played club rugby for Exeter Chiefs whilst studying at Exeter University then the Glasgow Warriors and Newport Gwent Dragons.

He played in 100 competitive games for Glasgow in a spell spanning 6 years from 2000 to 2006.

After moving to Newport in June 2006 he played in over 50 games in three seasons before a serious neck injury, cut his career short in June 2009. He was released by the Dragons following neck surgery at the end of his contract.

References

External links
Newport Gwent Dragons profile

1977 births
Living people
Dragons RFC players
English rugby union players
Glasgow Warriors players
Rugby union players from Gravesend, Kent
Scottish rugby union players
Rugby union props